Provan Gas Works is an industrial gas holding plant in the city of Glasgow, Scotland. The plant lies between the Blackhill, Blochairn, Germiston and Provanmill areas of the city, and was built by Glasgow Corporation between 1900 and 1904. It later became part of British Gas, and subsequently Transco and most recently Scotia Gas Networks (a subsidiary of Scottish and Southern Energy) who operate it today.

Originally the plant was a gasworks, manufacturing town gas via the cooking of coal. The plant was expanded after 1919. Following nationalisation of the gas supply in 1948, the plant passed to the Scottish Gas Board, and then to British Gas in 1973. In 1972, supplies of inexpensive natural gas from North Sea oilfields became available. The gasworks was downsized significantly in the 1980s in response to changing economic conditions arising as the British gas industry was privatised under Prime Minister Margaret Thatcher.  Today the plant is largely unmanned, used solely for gas storage and distribution.

The plant has become significant for its two massive column-guided gasometers and an additional spiral-guided gasometer, which have become an iconic industrial landmark in Glasgow's East End. Their combined storage capacity is  – each enough to supply a city the size of York for an entire day.

Since the construction of the M8 and M80 motorways in the 1970s and 1980s, which run directly next to the plant, the twin gasholders have become an unofficial portal into the city's central area for drivers from Edinburgh and the north. The towers have also gained an affectionate following among locals since they are often used to display huge placards showcasing the various promotional slogans for the city, the most memorable being the "Glasgow's Miles Better" and "Everyone's Glasgowing On" campaigns.

The future of the plant is under discussion: Glasgow City Council have proposed plans for decontaminating the unused land on the brownfield site and redeveloping it for commercial use.  In 2012, Scotia Gas Networks announced that the twin column-guided and single spiral-guided gasometers were to be decommissioned, with no decision made on their future. The twin column-guided gasholders were protected as Category B listed structures in 2018 by Historic Environment Scotland (with associated buildings on the site listed at Category C), a decision which the owners disputed due to the high maintenance costs involved, particularly when no longer being used for their originally designed purpose. However, the listed status (along with a pair of similar structures located in the city's Temple / Kelvindale area) was upheld after appeal, supported by local MP Paul Sweeney, who called for the creative reuse of the structures, citing other examples from around the UK and internationally such as Gasometer Vienna, Gasometer Oberhausen, Østre Gasværk Teater and Newstead Gasworks.

In 2020, the Scottish Prison Service announced that it intended to buy  of land adjacent to the gas works to build a replacement for HM Prison Barlinnie.

Demolition of the unlisted spiral-guided gasometer began in 2020.

References

Brochure about methods of removing old gasometers, if necessary, describing the ones at Provan Gas Works as two of the biggest in Scotland (PDF requires Adobe Acrobat Reader)

External links
Return to Provan Gasworks, I&H Brown
Works Overview / Gasholder 1 / Gasholder 2 / Gasholder 3 at Canmore

Buildings and structures in Glasgow
Natural gas storage
Buildings and structures completed in 1904
Natural gas infrastructure in the United Kingdom
1904 establishments in Scotland
Category B listed buildings in Glasgow
Industrial buildings in Scotland
Gas holders